The Kuchuk is a river in Altai Krai, Russia.

The basin of the river is located in the Rodinsky and Blagoveshchensky districts. There are a number of villages near its banks, such as Nizhny Kuchuk, Stepnoy Kuchuk, Kayaushka, Novotroitsk, Voznesenka and Tsentralnoye. The ghost-town of Verkh-Nezamay is also located by the river. Founded in 1910, it was abolished in 2003.

Course 
The Kuchuk river system is an endorheic basin between the Ob and the Irtysh rivers. In its upper course the river flows northwards, then it bends westwards and flows meandering in a roughly western direction within the Kulunda Plain. In its last stretch it heads in a roughly northwestern direction.

Tributaries  
The river is largely fed by groundwater. It is frozen between November and April.

See also
List of rivers of Russia

References

External links
 The syntaxonomy of the meadow vegetation of Kulunda and Kasmala pine forest strips (Altai Territory)

Rivers of Altai Krai
West Siberian Plain